Children's Literature in Education is an academic journal about children's literature.

Children's Literature in Education was founded in 1970. It emerged from a series of conferences on children's literature held at the University of Exeter from 1969 to 1973, particularly a 1969 conference at St Luke's Campus titled "Recent Children's Fiction and Its Role in Education". Early issues reprinted papers given at the Exeter conferences.

, the journal was published by Springer Science+Business Media.

Indexing 
Children's Literature in Education is indexed in:

References

Further reading 
 
 

English-language journals
Education journals
Springer Science+Business Media academic journals
Children's literature